John Hillary Swaim  (March 11, 1874 – December 27, 1945) was a Major League Baseball pitcher. He played with the Washington Senators of the National League in 1897 and 1898. Prior to that he played with Mount Union College.

Sources

1874 births
1945 deaths
Major League Baseball pitchers
Baseball players from Ohio
Washington Senators (1891–1899) players
19th-century baseball players
Twin Cities Twins players
Fort Wayne Farmers players
New Castle Salamanders players
Milwaukee Brewers (minor league) players
Milwaukee Creams players
Terre Haute Hottentots players
University of Mount Union alumni